Bathmocercus is a genus of bird in the family Cisticolidae. 
It contains the following species:
 Black-headed rufous warbler (Bathmocercus cerviniventris)
 Black-faced rufous warbler (Bathmocercus rufus)

Species from the genus Scepomycter are sometimes placed in this genus though several marked morphological differences are used to justify its separation.

References
Ryan, Peter (2006). Family Cisticolidae (Cisticolas and allies). pp. 378–492 in del Hoyo J., Elliott A. & Christie D.A. (2006) Handbook of the Birds of the World. Volume 11. Old World Flycatchers to Old World Warblers Lynx Edicions, Barcelona 
 Nguembock B.; Fjeldsa J.; Tillier A.; Pasquet E. (2007): A phylogeny for the Cisticolidae (Aves: Passeriformes) based on nuclear and mitochondrial DNA sequence data, and a re-interpretation of a unique nest-building specialization. Molecular Phylogenetics and Evolution 42: 272–286.

 
Bird genera
Taxonomy articles created by Polbot